Stefan Nicolaas Dercon, is a Belgian-British economist and a Professor of Economic Policy at the Blavatnik School of Government and the Department of Economics at the University of Oxford. He is also the Director of the Centre for the Study of African Economies. 

In 2011–17, Dercon was the chief economist of the UK Department for International Development (DfID). Before DfID, Dercon was a Professor of Development Economics at Oxford University, and the lead academic for the Ethiopia country programme at the International Growth Centre, which is a research centre based jointly at The London School of Economics and Political Science and the University of Oxford. 

Between 2000-02, he was a Programme Director at the World Institute of Development Economics (WIDER), United Nations University, where he led their research programme on “Insurance against Poverty”. Prior to this, between 1993 and 2000, he was a tenured professor of development economics at the Katholieke Universiteit Leuven, Belgium.

He is a Senior Fellow of the Bureau for Research and Economic Analysis of Development (BREAD), a Research Fellow of Centre for Economic Policy Research (CEPR) and of IZA Institute of Labor Economics, and an Affiliate of the Abdul Latif Jameel Poverty Action Lab (J-PAL).

Dercon studied at the Catholic University of Leuven (Belgium), where he obtained a BPhil degree in 1985 and a Licentiate in Economics in 1986. He subsequently received an MPhil in 1988 and a DPhil degree in 1992, both in Economics from the University of Oxford.

In 2018, the Queen awarded him as an Honorary Companion of the Order of St Michael and St George (CMG) for services to economics and international development. In 2021, because he also acquired British nationality, his honour was converted into a substantive one.

His book, Dull Disasters? How Planning Ahead Will Make A Difference was published in 2016, and provides a blueprint for renewed application of science, improved decision making, better preparedness, and pre-arranged finance in the face of natural disasters.

Key themes 

His research as focused on a range of subjects including:
 risk and poverty
 agriculture and rural institutions, 
 political economy, 
 childhood poverty, 
 social and geographic mobility, 
 micro-insurance, and 
 measurement issues related to poverty and vulnerability.

Noted works 

(2022) Gambling on Development: Why Some Countries Win and Others Lose, Hurst Publishers.
(2004) Insurance against Poverty, 2004, Oxford University Press (Edited volume)
(2002) The Impact of Economic Reforms on Rural Households in Ethiopia, Washington D.C. World Bank.

Together with political economist Chris Blattman he ran a randomized controlled trial in Ethiopia that investigated the impact of low-skill industrial jobs on the welfare of the workers. The research was covered by Our World in Data and the Financial Times.

References

External links and sources 
 Dercon personal webpage
 International Growth Centre website

Development economists
Development specialists
Fellows of Wolfson College, Oxford
Companions of the Order of St Michael and St George
Living people
Year of birth missing (living people)